According to Transparency International's Global Corruption Barometer 2013, corruption is a large concern in the public sector as more than half of the surveyed households consider Parliament, police, public officials, and particularly the judiciary and political parties very corrupt.

On Transparency International's 2021 Corruption Perceptions Index, North Macedonia scored 39 on a scale from 0 ("highly corrupt") to 100 ("highly clean"). When ranked by score, North Macedonia ranked 87th among the 180 countries in the Index, where the country ranked first is perceived to have the most honest public sector.  For comparison, the best score was 88 (ranked 1), and the worst score was 11 (ranked 180).

The business environment in  North Macedonia is negatively affected by corruption. Several sources indicate that corruption is considered an obstacle for doing business, and businessmen have reported that bribery is demanded sometimes during public procurement and contracting.

Anti-corruption efforts 
The European Commission Progress Report 2013 indicates some positive developments regarding  North Macedonia's law enforcement and corruption prevention activities.

See also
2016 Macedonian protests

References

External links
Macedonia Corruption Profile from the Business Anti-Corruption Portal

Macedonia
Crime in North Macedonia by type
Politics of North Macedonia